Enrico Raphael Quiogue Nacino (born March 21, 1987 in Baguio, Benguet, Philippines), known professionally as Rocco Nacino, is a Filipino actor. He won the title of Second Prince in the fifth season of StarStruck. He is currently an exclusive artist under GMA Artist Center.

Early and personal life
Nacino was born in Baguio and was raised in Singapore and Laguna, his father's hometown. He studied Nursery up to Primary 6 in Singapore, and also learned to speak Mandarin during his grade school days. He received his secondary education in Makati Hope Christian School and tertiary education in Mapúa Institute of Technology. He passed the Philippine Nurse Licensure Examination in June 2009 in Manila.

On his first year of college at Mapua Makati, he participated in the Mister and Miss Cardinals and won as Mister Cardinals 2005.  This opened new opportunities for him to appear on TV commercials and print media.  Among his projects were endorsements for Vaseline, Skyflakes, Goya, Jollibee, Chowking, Smart, Pepsi and STI. His sports are jiujitsu, muay thai, mixed martial arts, boxing, arnis and basketball. He also trains wing chun regularly. He also plays drums and a little of guitar.

He is a nephew of the late Manuel Quiogue, former president and COO of GMA Marketing and Productions, Inc.

Nacino proposed to Melissa Gohing on November 20, 2020, in Antipolo City and got married on January 21, 2021, aboard naval ship.

Career
Nacino joined the Myx VJ Search in 2007 but failed to win. He then joined Star Struck V and won as the 2nd Prince.

His biggest break on television was when he bagged a role in  Sine Novela Presents: Gumapang Ka sa Lusak, opposite Jennylyn Mercado and Dennis Trillo. This was followed by another teleserye at GMA Network’s Dramarama sa Hapon block, Koreana, with Kris Bernal as his love interest. His performance in Koreana gave him his first acting nomination from the Entertainment Press Society (Enpres) as Finalist for Outstanding Performance by an Actor for the Golden TV Awards in 2011. With the large viewership and high ratings garnered by Koreana, Nacino was given a more challenging project in the first-ever dance serye Time of My Life, with Kris Bernal and Mark Herras.

He was part of the weekly fantasy sitcom, Kaya ng Powers, with Rhian Ramos, Sheena Halili, Elmo Magalona, Joey Marquez and Rufa Mae Quinto. He also did a cameo in the finale week of Amaya, where he played the role of Adult Banuk. He also top-billed a 5-episode weekly series, Love Bug presents: Mistaken Identity, where he was paired with Lovi Poe.

Nacino's first indie film was an entry at the 2011 Cinemalaya Film Festival, Ang Sayaw ng Dalawang Kaliwang Paa, with Paulo Avelino and Jean Garcia, where he showcased his acting capabilities and earned his first prestigious acting awards when he was chosen by the Philippine Movie Press Club as the "New Movie Actor of the Year" in the 28th PMPC Star Awards for Movies; and by the Entertainment Press Society (Enpres) as "Best Breakthrough Performance by an Actor" in the 9th Golden Screen Awards. Nacino also did cameo roles in the movies My Valentine Girls and My Kontrabida Girl. He also played the brother of Judy Ann Santos at the 37th Metro Manila Film Festival, My House Husband: Ikaw Na!, directed by Jose Javier Reyes.

He portrayed the Philippines' national hero Jose Rizal in Howie Severino's multi-awarded documentary Pluma: Ang Dakilang Manunulat. The documentary was nominated as Best Documentary at the New York Film Festival. He then starred in The Good Daughter, opposite Kylie Padilla. He also played the title role, Lam-ang – an epic movie that was shot in Ilocos, with Rochelle Pangilinan as his leading lady. He also appears weekly in Party Pilipinas and Bubble Gang.

His indie film, I Love You, Pare Ko, opposite to Rodjun Cruz, was released in 2012.

Discography

Studio albums

Filmography

Television

Films

Awards and nominations

References

External links
 Rocco Nacino at iGMA.tv
 

1987 births
Living people
Filipino Christians
Filipino evangelicals
Filipino male television actors
Filipino male models
VJs (media personalities)
GMA Network personalities
Tagalog people
People from Baguio
People from Cainta
StarStruck (Philippine TV series) participants
Mapúa University alumni